This is a list of schools in the South American country of Argentina.  It records the country's notable state and private schools. Tertiary schools are presented separately on the list of universities in Argentina.

See also

 Education in Argentina
 Lists of schools

References

Schools
Schools
Argentina
Argentina

Schools